Barton is an unincorporated community in Deuel County, Nebraska, United States. It is located west of Big Springs, along the South Platte River, half way to the Colorado border.

History
Barton was named for a local resident, Guy C. Barton of North Platte.

References

Populated places in Deuel County, Nebraska
Unincorporated communities in Nebraska